Difundella is a monotypic snout moth genus described by Harrison Gray Dyar Jr. in 1914. It contains the species Difundella corynophora, described by the same author, found in Panama.

References

Phycitinae
Monotypic moth genera
Moths of Central America
Pyralidae genera